Whig Lord John Russell led the government of the United Kingdom of Great Britain and Ireland from 1846 to 1852.

History

Following the split in the Tory Party over the Corn Laws in 1846 and the consequent end of Sir Robert Peel's second government, the Whigs came to power under Lord John Russell. Sir Charles Wood became Chancellor of the Exchequer, Sir George Grey Home Secretary and Lord Palmerston Foreign Secretary for the third time.

One of the major problems facing the government was the Great Irish Famine (1845–1849), which Russell failed to deal with effectively. Another problem was the maverick Foreign Secretary Lord Palmerston, who was eventually forced to resign in December 1851 after recognising the coup d'état of Louis Napoleon without first seeking royal approval. He was succeeded by Lord Granville, the first of his three tenures as Foreign Secretary. Palmerston thereafter successfully devoted his energies to bringing down Russell's government, leading to the formation of a minority Conservative government under Lord Derby in February 1852.

Cabinet

July 1846 – February 1852

† became the Earl of Carlisle in 1848
‡ denotes becoming a member of the cabinet, not gaining the office

Notes
Lord Carlisle served as both Chancellor of the Duchy of Lancaster and First Commissioner of Woods and Forests between March and July 1850.

Changes
July 1847: Henry Labouchere succeeds Lord Clarendon as President of the Board of Trade.  Labouchere's successor as Chief Secretary for Ireland is not in the cabinet.  Thomas Babington Macaulay leaves the cabinet.  His successor as Paymaster-General is not in the Cabinet.
January 1849: Sir Francis Baring succeeds Lord Auckland as First Lord of the Admiralty
March 1850: Lord Carlisle succeeds Lord Campbell as Chancellor of the Duchy of Lancaster.  He remains First Commissioner of Woods and Forests
July 1850: Lord Truro succeeds Lord Cottenham as Lord Chancellor. Lord Seymour succeeds Lord Carlisle as First Commissioner of Woods and Forests.  Lord Carlisle remains Chancellor of the Duchy of Lancaster.
1851: Fox Maule, the Secretary at War, and Lord Granville, the Paymaster-General, enter the Cabinet
December 1851: Lord Granville succeeds Lord Palmerston as Foreign Secretary.  Granville's successor as Paymaster-General is not in the Cabinet
February 1852: Fox Maule succeeds Sir John Cam Hobhouse as President of the Board of Control.  Maule's successor as Secretary at War is not in the Cabinet.

List of ministers
Cabinet members are listed in bold face.

References
C. Cook and B. Keith, British Historical Facts 1830–1900

British ministries
Government
1840s in the United Kingdom
1846 establishments in the United Kingdom
1850s in the United Kingdom
1852 disestablishments in the United Kingdom
Ministries of Queen Victoria
Cabinets established in 1846
Cabinets disestablished in 1852